Burrell was a merchant ship built at Newcastle in 1825. She made two voyages transporting convicts from England to Australia.

Career
On her first convict voyage, under the command of John Metcalf and surgeon William West, she departed Plymouth on 27 July 1830, with 192 male convicts. She arrived in Sydney on 10 December 1830. There was three convict deaths en route. The second convict voyage, under the command of John Metcalf and surgeon George Williams, she departed Woolwich on 8 January 1832 with 101 female convicts. She arrived in Sydney on 20 May 1832 and had no deaths en route.

She plied the London/Liverpool-Quebec route and was last listed in 1854.

References
Bateson, Charles, The Convict Ships, 1787–1868, Sydney, 1974. 
Lloyd's Register 1832
Lloyd's Register 1850

1825 ships
Ships built on the River Tyne
Convict ships to New South Wales
Age of Sail merchant ships